Millegin railway station, Millagan railway station or later Millegin Siding was briefly an intermediate stop situated on what became the Great North of Scotland Railway (GNoSR) line from Grange and Cairnie Junction to . Millegin served the rural community and the nearby saw mill in Banffshire. The line northwards ran to Tillynaught where it split to reach Banff by a branch line or Elgin by the Moray Coast line.

Millegin was opened in 1859 by the Banff, Portsoy and Strathisla Railway, and closed to passengers in October 1860, remaining as a freight siding that was however lifted by 1902. The line passed into British Railways ownership in 1948 and was, like the rest of the ex-GNoSR lines along the Moray coast, considered for closure as part of the Beeching report, closure notices were issued in 1963.

Station infrastructure
In 1867 the OS map shows that the station had closed and only a siding was present with a loading dock, by 1902 the siding had been lifted.

No physical remains of the station or siding are visible on site.

See also
List of Great North of Scotland Railway stations

References
Notes

Sources

External links
RailScot - Banff Portsoy and Strathisla Railway
The Banff Branch

Former Great North of Scotland Railway stations
Railway stations in Great Britain opened in 1859
Railway stations in Great Britain closed in 1860
Disused railway stations in Moray
1859 establishments in Scotland
1860 disestablishments in the United Kingdom